Chi Limited, incorporated in 1980, is a fast-moving consumer goods company that provides consumer products in the dairy, beverages, and snacks sectors. The company's headquarter is in Lagos, Nigeria and it is primarily owned by The Coca-Cola Company.

Chi Limited's major manufacturing facility is located in Lagos. The flagship products of the firm are Capri-sonne and Chivita, it holds the Nigerian license to market Caprisun.

History

Incorporated in Nigeria in 1980 by Dutch entrepreneur, Cornelis Vink, it began operations in March of the same year. The company became part of the Tropical General Investment (TGI) conglomerate which has diverse business interests in food, healthcare, agriculture, engineering and other industries. The company began distribution of Capri sonne in 1982 which later emerged as one of its flagship brands. In 1990, it introduced to market CHI juice, which was originally sold in cans but after a couple of years it was packaged in Tetra Pak. In 1996, the firm introduced Chivita orange flavoured juice to the market and like the previous drink it was originally sold in cans until 1997 when a paper carton packaging machine was installed. The firm later launched three new flavours in Tetra Brik: pineapple, mango and apple and in 1999 it introduced blends of orange and pineapple.

CHI Limited was pioneer in the industry in the use of Tetra Pak packaging for its dairy product, Hollandia.

On 30 January 2016, Coca-Cola announced a binding agreement for The Coca-Cola Company to acquire an initial minority equity shareholding in Chi Limited. Within the agreement, Coca-Cola made an initial 40 percent equity investment in Chi Limited and intends to increase ownership to 100 percent within three years, subject to regulatory approvals, while working on other long-term commercial structures.

On January 30, 2019 The Coca-Cola Company announced that it now has a 100 percent ownership stake in CHI Limited. After acquiring the remaining 60% it did not already own.

International Brand Partnership

Manchester United

Chi Limited signed an endorsement deal with Manchester United F.C. making them the official drink partner of the Manchester United F.C. in Nigeria. The partnership allows CHI Limited to use the Manchester United F.C's brand assets on a range of Chi products in Nigeria. The partnership is expected to burnish the company's image especially amongst the 50 million followers of Manchester United F.C. in Nigeria.

See also

 Chivita 100%
 Hollandia Yoghurt
 Capri-Sonne

References

External links
 

Food and drink companies established in 1980
1980 establishments in Nigeria
Manufacturing companies based in Lagos
Food and drink companies of Nigeria
Nigerian brands
Nigerian companies established in 1980